is a Japanese footballer currently playing as a forward for Oita Trinita as a designated special player.

Career statistics

Club
.

 Notes

References

External links

2000 births
Association football forwards
Association football people from Miyazaki Prefecture
Japanese footballers
Living people
Miyazaki Sangyo-keiei University alumni
Oita Trinita players